The All-Pac-12 football team is an annual Pac-12 Conference honor bestowed on the best players in the conference following every college football season. Pac-12 coaches select first and second teams that each typically consists of 11 offensive players (a quarterback, two running backs, two wide receivers, a tight end, and five offensive linemen), 11 defensive players (four defensive linemen, three linebackers, and four defensive backs),  and four specialists (a punter, a kicker, a return specialist, and a special teams player). Ties result in additional players being selected. Votes are based on a weighted ranking, and coaches are allowed to select players from their own team. Players placed on the first team are given an award by the conference, while those on the second team receive a certificate. Players that are not named all-conference may receive honorable mention if they received at least two votes. The preliminary results are then given to the coaches, who may choose to name as many as two additional players from their respective program for honorable mention from the conference.

The conference was founded as the Pacific Coast Conference (PCC), in 1915, which principal members founded the Athletic Association of Western Universities (AAWU) in 1959, and subsequently went by the names Pacific-8, Pacific-10, becoming the Pac-12 in 2011.

Seasons
Following is a list of all-conference teams in the history of the Pac-12:

1916 All-Pacific Coast football team
1919 All-Pacific Coast football team
1920 All-Pacific Coast football team
1921 All-Pacific Coast football team
1922 All-Pacific Coast football team
1923 All-Pacific Coast football team
1924 All-Pacific Coast football team
1925 All-Pacific Coast football team
1926 All-Pacific Coast football team
1927 All-Pacific Coast football team
1928 All-Pacific Coast football team
1929 All-Pacific Coast football team
1930 All-Pacific Coast football team
1931 All-Pacific Coast football team
1932 All-Pacific Coast football team
1933 All-Pacific Coast football team
1934 All-Pacific Coast football team
1935 All-Pacific Coast football team
1936 All-Pacific Coast football team
1937 All-Pacific Coast football team
1938 All-Pacific Coast football team
1939 All-Pacific Coast football team
1940 All-Pacific Coast Conference football team
1941 All-Pacific Coast Conference football team
1942 All-Pacific Coast football team
1943 All-Pacific Coast football team
1944 All-Pacific Coast football team
1945 All-Pacific Coast football team
1946 All-Pacific Coast football team
1947 All-Pacific Coast Conference football team
1948 All-Pacific Coast Conference football team
1949 All-Pacific Coast Conference football team
1950 All-Pacific Coast Conference football team
1951 All-Pacific Coast Conference football team
1952 All-Pacific Coast Conference football team
1953 All-Pacific Coast Conference football team
1954 All-Pacific Coast Conference football team
1955 All-Pacific Coast Conference football team
1956 All-Pacific Coast Conference football team
1957 All-Pacific Coast Conference football team
1958 All-Pacific Coast Conference football team
1959 All-Pacific Coast football team
1960 All-Pacific Coast football team
1961 All-Pacific Coast football team
1962 All-Pacific Coast football team
1963 All-Pacific Coast football team
1964 All-Pacific Athletic Conference football team
1965 All-Pacific Athletic Conference football team
1966 All-Pacific-8 Conference football team
1967 All-Pacific-8 Conference football team
1968 All-Pacific-8 Conference football team
1969 All-Pacific-8 Conference football team
1970 All-Pacific-8 Conference football team
1971 All-Pacific-8 Conference football team
1972 All-Pacific-8 Conference football team
1973 All-Pacific-8 Conference football team
1974 All-Pacific-8 Conference football team
1975 All-Pacific-8 Conference football team
1976 All-Pacific-8 Conference football team
1977 All-Pacific-8 Conference football team
1978 All-Pacific-10 Conference football team
1979 All-Pacific-10 Conference football team
1980 All-Pacific-10 Conference football team
1981 All-Pacific-10 Conference football team
1982 All-Pacific-10 Conference football team
1983 All-Pacific-10 Conference football team
1984 All-Pacific-10 Conference football team
1985 All-Pacific-10 Conference football team
1986 All-Pacific-10 Conference football team
1987 All-Pacific-10 Conference football team
1988 All-Pacific-10 Conference football team
1989 All-Pacific-10 Conference football team
1990 All-Pacific-10 Conference football team
1991 All-Pacific-10 Conference football team
1992 All-Pacific-10 Conference football team
1993 All-Pacific-10 Conference football team
1994 All-Pacific-10 Conference football team
1995 All-Pacific-10 Conference football team
1996 All-Pacific-10 Conference football team
1997 All-Pacific-10 Conference football team
1998 All-Pacific-10 Conference football team
1999 All-Pacific-10 Conference football team
2000 All-Pacific-10 Conference football team
2001 All-Pacific-10 Conference football team
2002 All-Pacific-10 Conference football team
2003 All-Pacific-10 Conference football team
2004 All-Pacific-10 Conference football team
2005 All-Pacific-10 Conference football team
2006 All-Pacific-10 Conference football team
2007 All-Pacific-10 Conference football team
2008 All-Pacific-10 Conference football team
2009 All-Pacific-10 Conference football team
2010 All-Pacific-10 Conference football team
2011 All-Pac-12 Conference football team
2012 All-Pac-12 Conference football team
2013 All-Pac-12 Conference football team
2014 All-Pac-12 Conference football team
2015 All-Pac-12 Conference football team
2016 All-Pac-12 Conference football team 
2017 All-Pac-12 Conference football team
2018 All-Pac-12 Conference football team
2019 All-Pac-12 Conference football team
2020 All-Pac-12 Conference football team
2021 All-Pac-12 Conference football team
2022 All-Pac-12 Conference football team

See also
College Football All-America Team
Pac-12 Conference football individual awards

References